Jack Katz may refer to:
 Jack Katz (businessman)
 Jack Katz (artist)